This is a list of mosques in Brunei.

As of 2019, there were 118 Islamic places of worship, including 102 Mosques, 5 Surau and 11  ("worship halls").

Brunei-Muara District

Belait District

Tutong District

Temburong District

See also 
 Islam in Brunei

References

External links
List of Mosques in Brunei

 
Brunei
Mosques